The Texas Triangle (also known as Texaplex) is a region of Texas which contains the state's five largest cities and is home to the majority of the state's population. The Texas Triangle is formed by the state's four main urban centers, Austin, Dallas–Fort Worth, Houston, and San Antonio, connected by Interstate 45, Interstate 10, and Interstate 35. In 2020, the population of the Texas Triangle reached nearly 21 million following rapid growth across much of Texas. The Texas Triangle is one of eleven megaregions in the United States, clusters of urban areas which share economic and cultural ties.

In 2004, the Texas Triangle contained five of the 20 largest cities in the U.S., and was home to more than 70% of all Texans, with a population of 13.8 million. In the next 40 years, the population of the Texas Triangle is projected to increase more than 65%, or 10 million people, and comprise 78% of all Texans.

Additional metropolitan areas in the region include Bryan-College Station, Killeen-Temple-Fort Hood, and Waco. Twelve micropolitan statistical areas are within the Triangle, which includes 66 counties. Beaumont, located east of Houston, has been considered part of the Texas Triangle by numerous studies dating from 2000. Burleson County is the center of the Texas Triangle.

Sizable metro areas in Texas outside the Triangle are Corpus Christi, El Paso, Lubbock, Midland–Odessa, Abilene, San Angelo, Laredo, Amarillo, Tyler, Longview, Wichita Falls, and the Rio Grande Valley.

Geography 

The megaregion is defined in work by America 2050 and others. Dr. Robert Lang of the Metropolitan Institute at Virginia Tech characterized Dallas–Fort Worth as one of the earliest recognized megapolitans. Although each city is distinct, Dallas and Fort Worth developed closely enough to form the urban area widely known as the Metroplex. A conference about the future of the Texas Triangle was held by Houston Tomorrow and America 2050 on September 24–25, 2009 in Houston.

The  region contains most of the state's largest cities and metropolitan areas, and in 2008 had a total of 17 million people and by 2020 had grown to nearly 21 million, nearly 75% of Texas's total population. The region is comparable to Florida in population and comparable to Georgia in area, but the Texas Triangle comprises less than a quarter of Texas's total land area.

According to the University of Texas at Austin Center for Sustainable Development, "the Texas Triangle has three sides measuring 271, 198, and 241 miles in ground distance."

Metropolitan areas
Austin–Round Rock–San Marcos metropolitan statistical area
Beaumont–Port Arthur metropolitan statistical area
Bryan–College Station metropolitan statistical area
Dallas–Fort Worth–Arlington metropolitan statistical area
Killeen–Temple–Fort Hood metropolitan statistical area
 metropolitan statistical area
San Antonio–New Braunfels metropolitan statistical area
Sherman–Denison metropolitan area
Waco metropolitan statistical area

Micropolitan areas

Brenham Micropolitan Statistical Area
Corsicana Micropolitan Statistical Area
Huntsville Micropolitan Statistical Area

Triangle counties
Sixty-seven counties are within the Texas Triangle. They are: Atascosa, Austin, Bandera, 
Bastrop,
Bell,
Bexar,
Brazoria,
Brazos,
Burleson,
Caldwell,
Chambers,
Collin,
Colorado,
Comal,
Cooke,
Coryell,
Dallas,
Delta,
Denton,
Ellis,
Falls,
Fayette,
Fort Bend,
Freestone,
Galveston,
Gonzales,
Grayson,
Grimes,
Guadalupe,
Hardin,
Harris,
Hays,
Henderson,
Hill,
Hood,
Houston,
Hunt,
Jefferson,
Johnson,
Kaufman,
Kendall,
Lavaca,
Lee,
Leon,
Liberty,
Limestone,
Madison,
McLennan,
Medina,
Milam,
Montgomery,
Navarro,
Orange,
Parker,
Rockwall,
Robertson,
San Jacinto,
Somervell,
Tarrant,
Travis,
Walker,
Waller,
Washington,
Wharton,
Williamson,
Wilson, and
Wise.

Politics

The Texas Triangle can be considered one of the more politically left-wing areas in Texas due to the anchoring cities of Houston, San Antonio, Dallas, Austin, and Fort Worth. All of these cities and their respective counties of Harris, Bexar, Dallas, Travis, and Tarrant all went towards Joe Biden in 2020, with Biden flipping Tarrant County, which went for Donald Trump in 2016. Suburbs around these five cities/counties such as Williamson, Hays, Denton, Collin, and Fort Bend Counties have voted more in line with the Democratic Party since the mid-late 2010s with Hillary Clinton flipping Fort Bend to the Democrats in 2016 for the first time since 1964, followed by Joe Biden improving upon Clinton's percentage of votes received for a Democratic presidential candidate in the region.

Prior to 2008, with the exception of Austin/Travis and San Antonio/Bexar (the latter a former bellwether/swing county and the former a liberal stronghold), all these cities/counties were conservative strongholds, having voted for Republicans from the 1960s through 2004, although the Democrats sometimes carried these counties in landslide Senate races. Even though most of the counties voted for George W. Bush in 2004, the Democratic party was starting to make inroads in these counties (the lone exception at the time was Tarrant).

This culminated with Barack Obama flipping Dallas, Harris, and Bexar counties to the Democratic party in 2008. This Democratic trend has continued through 2020 and even extends to the city/county office positions as well as the Senate races, with the Democratic challenger picking up four out of the five aforementioned counties through 2016, and then all five in 2020, although as recently as 2012 and 2014, Harris and Bexar county backed John Cornyn and Ted Cruz (although Ted Cruz failed to pick up the latter county in 2012) in their successful Senate bids in 2012 and 2014 respectively. In 2020, Joe Biden would improve upon Obama's margins in these counties, largely due to urban/suburban revolt against Trump. Biden would win Dallas county by 291,500 votes or 64.89% of the vote compared to Trump's 33.29% of the vote, Harris county by 216,563 votes or 55.96% of the vote compared to Trump's 42.70% of the vote, Bexar county by 139,834 votes or 58.20% of the vote compared to Trump's just over 40.05% of the vote, and Travis county by 274,523 votes or 71.41% of the vote compared to Trump's 26.43% of the vote, his worst showing anywhere in the Texas Triangle.

Starting in the mid-late 2010s, Democrats started to make inroads in Dallas' western neighbor Tarrant County. Tarrant would in 2018 go on to back Beto O'Rourke's unexpectedly competitive senate campaign against Ted Cruz, and three Democrats won seats on the Justice of the Peace court. The Democratic trend in the county would continue into 2020 with Joe Biden winning the county by a razor thin margin of 2,096 votes (or 49.31%) over Donald Trump. Biden's victory came despite John Cornyn outperforming Trump and carrying the county in the concurrent Senate race.

Also in the mid-late 2010s, Democrats have started to make significant inroads in the suburban counties around Austin, Houston, and Dallas, largely due to the aforementioned urban/suburban revolt against Trump. For instance, in Collin County, Biden only lost the county by 21,373 votes or 4.34%, the Democrats best showing since narrowly losing the county by 3.54% or 576 votes in 1968. In Denton County, Biden lost by 8.08% or 33,785 votes, the best for a Democrat since 1968 when they narrowly lost the county by 4.03% or 759 votes.

In Hays County, the Democratic margins have steadily increased, eventually going for Biden with him receiving 54.4% of the vote or 59,524 votes compared to Trump's 47,680 votes or 43.6% of the vote. Interestingly enough, Biden's win was the best since Bill Clinton flipped the county by 3.1% in 1992. The county also flipped from supporting John Cornyn in his 2014 Senate bid to his Democratic challenger MJ Hegar in her 2020 bid against Cornyn. In Williamson County, Texas, Biden only won it by 49.6% of the vote or 143,795 votes compared to Trump's 48.2% of the vote or 139,729 votes. This is the second county along with Tarrant to support John Cornyn in his successful 2020 Senate bid despite backing Joe Biden.

In Fort Bend County, Hillary Clinton flipped the county Democratic in 2016, winning with 51.4% of the vote or 134,868 votes compared to Trump's 44.8% of the vote or 117,291 votes. In 2020, despite votes for Trump increasing, it was still not enough to flip the county back to Republican hands, and in fact, his percent of the vote decreased by .7 to 44.1% of the vote or 157,718 votes while Biden improved upon Clinton's 2016 totals by increasing his share of the vote by 3.4% to 54.7% of the vote or 195,552 votes.

Since 1912, Travis county has been consistently a liberal stronghold at the presidential level. During this time, it only backed the Republican candidate six times, all Republican landslides except for 2000. 2000 remains the last time a Republican presidential candidate captured the county and the last time a third-party candidate affected the results. This more than likely was due to the somewhat strong showing of third-party candidate Ralph Nader, who polled in a 10.37% vote share, his best in any Texas county, likely due to some Al Gore voters voting for Nader instead.

Despite being a liberal stronghold at the Presidential level, it has gone Republican more times in Senate races. For example, Kay Bailey Hutchison won the county in all but one of her Senate bids, that being 2006. Ted Cruz would continue the losing streak, losing the county in both his 2012 and 2018 bids. John Cornyn, in all his senate bids since 2002 has never won this county, and is one of two in the Triangle to never have backed him, the other being Dallas County. It has also gone Republican in gubernatorial races, most recently in 1998 when George W. Bush won a second term to the governorship.

Despite the five biggest cities being within the Triangle, there are also a great deal of rural, conservative counties. It is in these counties where Republicans poll their best, although Bill Clinton won a decent amount of these counties in 1992.

See also 

Consolidated city-county
Conurbation
I-35 Corridor
Megacity
Megalopolis
Megaregions of the United States
Merger (politics)
Metropolis
Micropolitan statistical area
Texas statistical areas

References

External links
America2050.org
Research on the Texas Triangle, University of Texas at Austin
TexasTriangle.biz
TexasTriangle.org
Texaplex.com

Regions of Texas
Megapolitan areas of the United States